The palmar radioulnar ligament (volar radioulnar ligament, anterior radioulnar ligament) is a narrow band of fibers extending from the anterior margin of the ulnar notch of the radius to the front of the head of the ulna.

It is sometimes abbreviated PRUL.

References

Ligaments of the upper limb